Babel (stylized in all caps) is a Japanese manga series written and illustrated by Yūgo Ishikawa, based on Takizawa Bakin's novel Nansō Satomi Hakkenden. It was serialized in Shogakukan's seinen manga magazine Big Comic Superior from December 2017 to August 2021.

Publication
Babell, written and illustrated by Yūgo Ishikawa and based on Takizawa Bakin's novel Nansō Satomi Hakkenden, started in Shogakukan's seinen manga magazine Big Comic Superior on December 22, 2017. From September 13, 2019, the manga was only published in the digital version of the magazine. It finished on August 27, 2021. Shogakukan has collected its chapters into individual tankōbon volumes. The first volume was released on May 30, 2018.

Volume list

References

Further reading

External links
 

Historical anime and manga
Manga based on novels
Seinen manga
Shogakukan manga